Simonds High School is a grade 9-12 school located in Saint John, New Brunswick. Simonds High School is in the Anglophone South School District.

See also
 List of schools in New Brunswick
 Anglophone South School District
 Saint John High School
 St. Malachy's Memorial High School
 Harbour View High School

References

Schools in Saint John County, New Brunswick
High schools in Saint John, New Brunswick